Lourdes High School is one of the oldest educational institutions in Kalyan in Maharashtra state in India. The school was established in 1938; the first principal of the school was Rev Father Francis Pereira. Under the leadership of Father William Athaide, the school went under a major reconstruction in 1991. The church inside the school premises was reconstructed, which started in 2004 and completed by 2007. In 2010, the school also started a Junior College for Science and Commerce.

See also
List of schools in India
List of schools in Kalyan

References 

High schools and secondary schools in Maharashtra
Christian schools in Maharashtra
Schools in Thane district
Education in Kalyan-Dombivli
Educational institutions established in 1938
1938 establishments in India